The 1917 Buffalo All-Stars team (or just "All-Buffalo" as they were known in local papers) played in the New York Pro Football League and would go on to post a 4–6–2 record.

Three of the losses came at the hands of either Ohio League and/or future National Football League teams from outside the state of New York.

The highlight of the season included two indoor games played against the 74th Regiment, NYNG infantry football team at the 74th armory over Christmas week.  The regiment, stationed at Camp Wadsworth in Spartanburg, SC, was home for the holidays.  Proceeds of the two games were given to the soldiers to off-set travel expenses.

Eugene F. Dooley played quarterback and also managed the team.

Schedule

References

Notes

External links
Pro Football Archives: 1917 Buffalo All-Stars season
PFRA Independent Football Ranking: 1917 Buffalo All-Stars

Buffalo All-Americans seasons
Buffalo All-stars Season, 1917
1917 in sports in New York (state)